Cyprinid herpesvirus 1 (CyHV-1) is a species of virus in the genus Cyprinivirus, family Alloherpesviridae, and order Herpesvirales.

References

External links 
 

Alloherpesviridae